Opiona is a genus of millipedes in the family Caseyidae. There are about 16 described species in Opiona.

Species
These 16 species belong to the genus Opiona:

 Opiona berryessae Gardner & Shelley, 1989
 Opiona bifurcata Gardner & Shelley, 1989
 Opiona casualis Gardner & Shelley, 1989
 Opiona columbiana Chamberlin, 1951
 Opiona communis Gardner & Shelley, 1989
 Opiona confusa Gardner & Shelley, 1989
 Opiona distincta Gardner & Shelley, 1989
 Opiona exigua Gardner & Shelley, 1989
 Opiona facetia Gardner & Shelley, 1989
 Opiona fisheri Gardner & Shelley, 1989
 Opiona goedeni Gardner & Shelley, 1989
 Opiona gonopods
 Opiona graeningi
 Opiona hatchi Causey, 1954
 Opiona scytonotoides Gardner & Shelley, 1989
 Opiona siliquae Causey, 1963

References

Further reading

 
 

Chordeumatida
Articles created by Qbugbot